Nassarius vanpeli is a species of sea snail, a marine gastropod mollusc in the family Nassariidae, the Nassa mud snails or dog whelks.

Description

Distribution
This species occurs in the Pacific Ocean off the Marquesas and New Caledonia.

References

 
Kool H.H. 2005. Two new western Pacific deep water species of Nassarius (Gastropoda: Prosobranchia: Nasssariidae): Nassarius herosae sp. nov. and Nassarius vanpeli sp. nov.Gloria Maris 44(3-4): 46-54
 Bouchet, P.; Fontaine, B. (2009). List of new marine species described between 2002-2006. Census of Marine Life.

Nassariidae
Gastropods described in 2005